Nine ships of the French Navy have borne the name Brillant:
 Brillant (1680) a 50-gun ship of the line (1670)
 Brillant (1672) a 40-gun ship of the line (1672)
 Brillant (1678) a 56-gun ship of the line (1678), originally built 1671 as  Furieux
 Brillant (1690) a 64-gun ship of the line (1690)
 Brillant (1725) a 56-gun ship of the line (1725)
 Brillant (1758) a 64-gun ship of the line (1758)
 Brillant (1774) a 64-gun ship of the line (1774)
 Brillant (1794) a small captured English lugger (1794)
 Brillant (1815) an 82-gun ship of the line captured by Great Britain in 1814 while still under construction

French Navy ship names